Ernst J. Cramer (* January 28, 1913 in Augsburg; † January 19, 2010 in Berlin) was a Germany-born publisher and Chairman of the Board of the Axel-Springer-Foundation.

Life 
His father Martin was an entrepreneur who lost his fortune during the Great Depression which is why Ernst could not finish highschool. Instead of becoming a teacher, Ernst had to work to support the family. A co-founder 1933 of a Zionist youth movement, Ernst was arrested after the  Night of Broken Glass and incarcerated for six weeks in Buchenwald. Thanks to a U.S. visa, he managed to emigrate in 1939 to the United States. His brother and parents were killed in the Shoa.
Ernst returned to Buchenwald as a U.S. soldier.

He was honored with numerous awards.

Honors
 1996 Leo Baeck Medal

References

External links 
AJC Mourns Passing of Holocaust Survivor Ernst Cramer
Then-Ambassador Dan Coats remembers Cramer warning him of fundamentalist, Islamic terrorism on the morning of September 11

1913 births
2010 deaths
German editors
Buchenwald concentration camp survivors
German journalists
Grand Crosses with Star and Sash of the Order of Merit of the Federal Republic of Germany
Recipients of the Order of Merit of Berlin
German emigrants to the United States